Dhanaulti is a quiet hill station at an elevation of 2286 meters above sea level, it offers panoramic views of the lofty Himalayas.

Dhanaulti is a tehsil in Tehri Garhwal district, Uttarakhand, India.

Dhanaulti is located on the important tourist circuit of Landour,Mussoorie,Kanatal,Chamba and New Tehri. The town is densely enveloped by the velvety rhododendrons, deodar, and tall oak forests. Heavy snowfall during winters, attracts many tourists here. 

Dhanaulti is still untouched by the maddening summer rush to hill stations, so it offers a holiday privacy that many seek. As Mussoorie has become overcrowded, many tourists prefer Dhanaulti. Dhanaulti is also an up and coming Honeymoon destination.

Climate 
The summer temperatures in the town, range from 20 °C to 25 °C, while winter temperatures remain between 7 °C and -1 °C.

Places of interest 

Dhanaulti is a major tourist destination in Uttarakhand, major attractions are listed below
Dhanaulti includes an area with two eco-parks, "Amber" and "Dhara", about 200 m apart. They have been developed by the Forest Department of Uttarakhand. It houses a protected patch of small forest containing Deodar Trees. The adventure sports facility is available for visitors in the form of walking over the flying fox and burma bridges and riding horses. There is also a facility for visitors to plant a sapling of tree species in the memory of their beloved, which is called as memory sapling plantation. Mussoorie Forest Department is running eco-huts for tourists.
Surkanda Devi Temple –  from Dhanaulti, on the road towards Chamba lies the Surkanda Devi Temple, famous for its Ganga Dussehra fair in autumn. It is part of the Devi Darshan triangle, which offers trekking opportunities around Dhanaulti - Surkanda Devi, Chandrabadni and Kunjapuri.
Sky Walk - walk at a height of 120ft from ground upon a 360ft long single wire rope.
Sky Bridging - At a height of 80 ft, walk the longest hanging bridge (300 ft. length) in India made by wire ropes and bamboos.
Zipline - You go down zipping on a wire rope and then from the middle you will swing high at 80ft.
Quad Biking - Ride an all-terrain vehicle (ATV) (Quad bike) up and down the slopes of the Himalayas.

Transport 

Gallery

See also
 Landour
 Mussoorie
 New Tehri
 Kanatal
 Chamba
 Tehri Dam
 Surkanda Devi

References

External links 

 
 Dhanaulti at wikimapia
 Blog on Dhanaulti with images and FAQs
 Dhanaulti Tourism

Cities and towns in Tehri Garhwal district
Tourism in Uttarakhand
Tourism by city
Adventure tourism in India
Zip-lining
Camping
Hill stations in Uttarakhand